Aminopeptidase B is an enzyme that in humans is encoded by the RNPEP gene.

References

Further reading

External links
 The MEROPS online database for peptidases and their inhibitors: M01.014

EC 3.4.11